Teldenia seriata is a moth in the family Drepanidae. Warren described it in 1922. It is found in New Guinea and on Goodenough Island.

References

Moths described in 1922
Drepaninae